Robert Douglas Finlayson (9 November 1909 – 11 January 1999), known professionally as Robert Douglas, was an English stage and film actor, a television director and producer.

Early career and personal life

Douglas was born in Fenny Stratford, Buckinghamshire. He studied at RADA and made his stage debut at the Theatre Royal, Bournemouth in 1927. A year later he made his first London appearance in Many Waters at the Ambassadors Theatre and went into films the following year.

Personal life and death
He was married twice, to actresses Dorothy Hyson (1914–1996) and Suzanne Weldon (1921–1995), fathering two children, Lucinda and Robert (Giles). He died from natural causes in Encinitas, California, aged 89.

Career

As an actor

Theatre

1927: The Best People (Theatre Royal Bournemouth + tour)
1928: Crime (Grand Theatre Croydon + tour)
1928: Many Waters (Ambassadors Theatre London)
1928: Mrs.Moonlight (Kingsway Theatre London)
1929: Black St. Anthony (Strand Theatre London)
1929: A Bill of Divorcement (St.Martin's Theatre London)
1929: Barbara's Wedding (Apollo Theatre London)
1929: Many Waters (in UK, in Canada / Maxine Elliott's Theatre, Broadway + Times Square Theater Broadway)
1930: The Last Enemy (Fortune Theatre London)
1930: Suspense (Duke of York's Theatre London)
1930: Badger's Green (Prince of Wales Theatre London)
1930: The Last Enemy (Hartford / New Haven + Shubert Theatre Broadway)
1931: After All (Criterion Theatre London + The New Theatre London)
1931: The Arch-Duchess (Phoenix-Theatre London)
1931: Vile Bodies (Arts Theatre London)
1931: Brief Moment (Detroit / Washington + Belasco Theatre Broadway + Cort Theatre Broadway)
1932: Vile Bodies (Vaudeville Theatre London)
1932: As it was in the Beginning (Arts Theatre London)
1933: Ten Minute Alibi (Embassy Theatre London + Haymarket Theatre London)
1933: These Two (Arts Theatre London)
1934: Men in White (Lyric Theatre London + tour)
1934: Overture 1920 (Phoenix Theatre London)
1934: Inside the Room (Queens Theatre London)
1935: Theatre Royal / The Royal Family (Lyric Theatre London + tour)
1935: Most of the Game (Cort Theatre Broadway)
1936: No Exit (Embassy Theatre London + St.Martin's Theatre London)
1936: Stubble before Swords (Globe Theatre London)
1936: Kind Lady (The King's Theatre Edinburgh + Lyric Theatre London)
1938: Official Secret (Tour + New Theatre London)
1938: Night Arrival (Globe Theatre London)
1939: The Spring Time of Others (Gate Theatre London)
1946: Lighten our Darkness (New Theatre Hull + tour)
1946: He Lived in Two Worlds (Wimbledon Theatre London + tour)
1946: But for the Grace of God (Royal Lyceum Theatre Edinburgh + tour + St.James Theatre London)

Film

1930: P. C. Josser (dir. Milton Rosmer) - Dick Summers
1931: Many Waters (dir. Milton Rosmer) - Godfrey Marvin
1933: The Blarney Stone / (US): The Blarney Kiss (dir. Tom Walls) - Lord Breethorpe
1935: Death Drives Through (dir. Edward L. Cahn) - Kit Woods
1937: London Melody / (US): Girl in the Street (dir. Herbert Wilcox) - Nigel Taplow
1937: Our Fighting Navy / (US): Torpedoed (dir. Norman Walker) - Capt. Markham
1938: The Challenge (dir. Milton Rosmer) - Edward Whymper
1939: Over the Moon (dir. Thornton Freeland) - The Unknown Man
1939: The Lion Has Wings (dir. Michael Powell) - Briefing Officer
1940: The Chinese Bungalow / (US): Chinese Den (dir. George King) - Richard Marquess
1947: The End of the River (dir. Derek N. Twist) - Jones
1948: The Adventures of Don Juan / (GB): The new Adventures of Don Juan (dir. Vincent Sherman) - Duke de Lorca
1948: The Decision of Christopher Blake (dir. Peter Godfrey) - Ken Blake
1949: Homicide (dir. Felix Jacoves) - Police Lt. Michael Landers
1949: The Fountainhead (dir. King Vidor) - Ellsworth M. Toohey
1949: The Hasty Heart (dir. Vincent Sherman) - Off-Screen Narrator (voice, uncredited)
1949: The Lady Takes a Sailor (dir. Michael Curtiz) - John Tyson
1950: Buccaneer's Girl (dir. Frederick De Cordova) - Narbonne
1950: Barricade (dir. Peter Godfrey) - Aubrey Milburn
1950: Spy Hunt / (GB): Panther's Moon (dir. George Sherman) - Stephen Paradou
1950: This Side of the Law (dir. Richard L. Bare) - Philip Cagle
1950: The Flame and the Arrow (dir. Jacques Tourneur) - Marchese Alessandro de Granazia
1950: Kim (dir. Victor Saville) - Colonel Creighton
1950: Mystery Submarine (dir. Douglas Sirk) - Cmdr. Eric von Molter
1951: Target Unknown (dir. George Sherman) - Col. von Broeck
1951: Thunder on the Hill / (GB): Bonaventure (dir. Douglas Sirk) - Dr. Edward Jeffreys
1952: At Sword's Point / (GB): Sons of the Musketeers (dir. Lewis Allen) - Duc de Lavalle
1952: Ivanhoe (dir. Richard Thorpe) - Sir Hugh De Bracy
1952: The Prisoner of Zenda (dir. Richard Thorpe) - Michael, Duke of Strelsau
1953: Fair Wind to Java (dir. Joseph Kane) - Saint Ebenezer / Pulo Besar
1953: The Desert Rats (dir. Robert Wise) - General
1953: Flight to Tangier (dir. Charles Marquis Warren) - Danzer
1954: Saskatchewan / (GB): O'Rourke of the Royal Mounted (dir. Raoul Walsh) - Benton
1954: King Richard and the Crusaders (dir. David Butler) - Sir Giles Amaury
1955: The Virgin Queen (dir. Henry Koster) - Sir Christopher Hatton
1955: The Scarlet Coat (dir. John Sturges) - Gen. Benedict Arnold
1955: Good Morning Miss Dove (dir. Henry Koster) - John Porter
1956: Helen of Troy (dir. Robert Wise) - Agamemnon
1959: The Young Philadelphians / (GB): The City Jungle (dir. Vincent Sherman) - Uncle Morton Stearnes
1959: Tarzan, the Ape Man (dir. Joseph M. Newman) - Col. James Parker
1961: The Lawbreakers (dir. Joseph M. Newman) - Allen Bardeman (archive footage)

Television

1939: The Royal Family of Broadway (TV Movie) - Tony Cavendish
1953: Chevron Theatre (episode: Serenade to an Empty House)
1955: Lux Video Theatre (episode: The Browning Version) - Frank Hunter
1955: Front Row Center (episode: The Barretts of Wimpole Street) - Robert Browning
1957: Panic! (episode: The Vigilantes) - Thomas Burdue / James Stuart
1958-1959: Alfred Hitchcock Presents (episodes: The Impromptu Murder, Arthur) - Inspector Ben Liebenberg / Inspector Charles Tarrant
1959: General Electric Theatre (episode: And One Was Loyal) - Roger Howard
1959-1961: 77 Sunset Strip (episodes: Eyewitness, Reserved for Mr.Bailey) - Dr.Emory Williams / The Voice (uncredited)
1959-1961: One Step Beyond (episodes: The Secret, Encounter, Night of Decision) - Gen. George Washington / Paul McCord / Harrison Ackroyd
1960: Adventures in Paradise (episodes: The Forbidden Sea, Peril at Pitcairn, There is an Island) - Albert Otherly / Albert Othery
1960: Walt Disney presents The Swamp Fox (episodes: Redcoat Strategy, A Case of Treason) - Gen. Cornwallis
1960: Maverick (episode: The Bundle from Britain) - Herbert
1961: The Asphalt Jungle (episode: The Lady and the Lawyer) - Allen Bardeman
1962: Thriller (episode: The Specialists) - Antony Hugh Swinburne
1970: Secret Ceremony (TV-Version) - Sir Alex Gordon
1972: Portrait: The Woman I Love (TV Movie) - Prime Minister Stanley Baldwin
1974: The Questor Tapes (TV Movie) - Dr. Michaels
1974: Cannon (episode: Triangle of Terror) (uncredited)
1975: Columbo (episode: Troubled Waters) - Dr. Frank Pierce
1975: Medical Center (episode: Survivors) - Miles Halloran
1975: The Invisible Man (episode: Man of Influence) - Dr. Theophilus
1978: Centennial (episode: The Shepherds) - Claude Richards (final appearance)

As a director

Theatre

1933: Ten Minute Alibi (Haymarket Theatre London)
1934: Overture 1920 (Phoenix Theatre London)
1946: Lighten Our Darkness (New Theatre Hull)
1956: The Ponder Heart (Shubert Theatre New Haven + Forrest Theatre Philadelphia + Shubert Theatre Boston + Music Box Theatre Broadway)
1956: Affair of Honor (Ethel Barrymore Theatre Broadway)
1956: The Loud Red Patrick (Walnut Theatre Philadelphia + Ambassador Theatre Broadway)
1956: Uncle Willie (Locust Street Theatre Philadelphia + John Golden Theatre Broadway)
1957: One Foot in the Door (Locust Street Theatre Philadelphia + Shubert Theatre Boston)

Film

1964: Night Train to Paris

Television

1960-1962: Surfside 6  (9 episodes)
1960: Maverick  (2 episodes)
1960-1962: 77 Sunset Strip  (12 episodes)
1961: The Roaring Twenties  (episode The Red Carpet)
1961-1962: Hawaiian Eye  (4 episodes)
1962-1963: Fair Exchange  (1. Segment)
1963-1964: The Alfred Hitchcock Hour  (4 episodes)
1962: The Virginian (episode  The Final Hour) =  The Final Hour (film)
1965: Kraft Suspense Theatre  (episode Kill me on July 20th)
1964-1965: Court Martial  (3 episodes)
1965-1967: 12 O'Clock High  (16 episodes)
1966: The Fugitive (episode Second Sight)
1966: Daniel Boone (episode The Matchmaker)
1967: Lost in Space (episode The Toymaker)
1967: Mission: Impossible (episode The Diamond)
1967: The Monroes (2 episodes)
1967-1974: The FBI  (13 episodes)
1967-1968: The Invaders (episodes The Prophet and Counterattack)
1969-1970: Adam-12  (6 episodes)
1970: The Immortal  (2 episodes)
1970: Dan August (episode Invitation to Murder)
1972-1975: The Streets of San Francisco  (4 episodes)
1972-1973: Cannon  (5 episodes)
1974: Barnaby Jones  (2 episodes)
1974: Shazam!  (4 episodes)
1974-1975: Medical Center  (6 episodes)
1975: Swiss Family Robinson  (episode The Pit)
1975-1978: Baretta  (9 episodes)
1976: City of Angels  (2 episodes)
1976: Columbo  (episode Old Fashioned Murder)
1976-1977: Big Hawaii  (episode Tightrope)
1977: Future Cop (2 episodes)
1977: Hunter  (episode Yesterday, Upon the Stair)
1977: The Man from Atlantis  (episode The Naked Montague)
1978: Quincy, M.E.  (episode Double Death)
1979-1981: Trapper John, M.D.  (4 episodes)
1979: Nobody's Perfect  (4 episodes)
1982: House Calls  (2 episodes)
1982: Fame (episode A Big Finish)

As a producer

1963-1964: The Alfred Hitchcock Hour  (8 episodes)
1964-1965: Court Martial  (10 episodes)

References

External links

1909 births
1999 deaths
English male film actors
English male stage actors
English male television actors
English television directors
English television producers
20th-century English male actors
Male actors from Buckinghamshire
Alumni of RADA
English emigrants to the United States
People from Milton Keynes